Mallard Peak is located on the border of Alberta and British Columbia. It is Alberta's 82nd most prominent mountain. It was named in 1920 by Arthur O. Wheeler. The summit of the mountain is said to look like a mallard duck.

See also
 List of peaks on the Alberta–British Columbia border
 Mountains of Alberta
 Mountains of British Columbia

References

Mallard Peak
Mallard Peak
Canadian Rockies